Abdallah (Ovadia) Somekh (1813 – September 13, 1889) was an Iraqi Jewish hakham, rosh yeshiva and posek.

Early life
Abdallah Somekh was born in 1813 in Baghdad to Abraham Somekh, himself a descendant of Nissim Gaon; he was the eldest of eight brothers and eight sisters. He studied under Jacob ben Joseph Harofe. He married Sarah, who bore him the children Saleh, Haron, Raphael, Khatoon, Abraham, Sasson, Massouda, Rachel and Simha.

Career
At first he earned his living as a merchant, but he devoted himself to the field of education when he saw the level of Torah study wane in Baghdad. Hakham Abdallah became head of the yeshiva Midrash Abu Menashe (established in 1840 by Heskel Menashe Zebaida); the yeshiva was later expanded and renamed Midrash Bet Zilkha and remained in operation until 1951.

As rosh yeshiva, Hakham Somekh was teacher of several Sephardi sages including his brother-in-law, Rabbi Yosef Chaim ("the Ben Ish Chai"), and Rabbi Yaakov Chaim Sofer ("the Kaf HaChaim"). He issued a great number of rulings, particularly in matters of shechita (Jewish slaughter of animals) and treifot—these rulings have been published in the work Zibhei Tzedek (Baghdad, 1914, 2 vols.), which became the handbook for Baghdadi Jews throughout India and the Far East. He also authored Responsa on all of the Shulchan Aruch.

Death
Hakham Abdallah died on Friday night September 13, 1889 during a cholera epidemic, and he was buried in the courtyard of the tomb of Yehoshua Kohen Gadol.

References

External links
 Rabbi Abdallah Somech
Hakham Abdallah Somekh

1813 births
1889 deaths
19th-century Iraqi rabbis
Rabbis from Baghdad
Rosh yeshivas
Sephardi Jews from the Ottoman Empire
Sephardi rabbis